Giovanni Francesco Barbieri (February 8, 1591 – December 22, 1666), better known as (il) Guercino, was an Italian Baroque painter and draftsman from Cento in the Emilia region, who was active in Rome and Bologna. The vigorous naturalism of his early manner contrasts with the classical equilibrium of his later works. His many drawings are noted for their luminosity and lively style.

Biography

Giovanni Francesco Barbieri was born into a family of peasant farmers in Cento, a town in the Po Valley mid-way between Bologna and Ferrara. Being cross-eyed, at an early age he acquired the nickname by which he is universally known, Guercino (a diminutive of the Italian noun ,  meaning 'squinter'). Mainly self-taught, at the age of 16, he worked as apprentice in the shop of Benedetto Gennari, a painter of the Bolognese School. An early commission was for the decoration with frescos (1615–1616) of Casa Pannini in Cento, where the naturalism of his landscapes already reveals considerable artistic independence, as do his landscapes on canvas Moonlit Landscape and Country Concert from the same era. In Bologna, he was winning the praise of Ludovico Carracci. He always acknowledged that his early style had been influenced by study of a Madonna painted by Ludovico Carracci for the Capuchin church in Cento, affectionately known as "La Carraccina".

His painting Et in Arcadia ego from around 1618–1622 contains the first known usage anywhere of the Latin motto, later taken up by Poussin and others, signifying that death lurks even in the most idyllic setting.  The dramatic composition of this canvas (related to his Flaying of Marsyas by Apollo (1617–1618) created for The Grand Duke of Tuscany, which shares the same pair of shepherds) is typical of Guercino's early works, which are often tumultuous in conception. He painted two large canvases, Samson Seized by Philistines (1619) and Elijah Fed by Ravens (1620), for Cardinal Serra, a Papal Legate to Ferrara. Painted at a time when it is unlikely that Guercino could have seen Caravaggio's work in Rome, these works nevertheless display a starkly naturalistic Caravaggesque style.

Rome

Guercino was recommended by Marchese Enzo Bentivoglio to the newly elected Bolognese Ludovisi Pope, Pope Gregory XV in 1621. The years he spent in Rome, 1621–23, were very productive. From this period are his frescoes Aurora at the casino of the Villa Ludovisi, the ceiling in San Crisogono (1622) of San Chrysogonus in Glory, the portrait of Pope Gregory XV (now in the Getty Museum), and the St. Petronilla Altarpiece for St. Peter's Basilica in the Vatican (now in the Museo Capitolini).

Return to Bologna
Following the death of Gregory XV in 1623, Guercino returned to his hometown of Cento.  In 1626, he began his frescoes in the Duomo of Piacenza. The details of his career after 1629 are well documented in the account book, the Libro dei Conti di Casa Barbieri, that Guercino and his brother Paolo Antonio Barbieri, a notable painter of still lifes, kept updated, and which has been preserved. Between 1618 and 1631, Giovanni Battista Pasqualini produced 67 engravings that document the early production of Guercino, which is not included in the Libro dei Conti. In 1642, following the death of his commercial rival Guido Reni, Guercino moved his busy workshop to Bologna, where he was now able to take over Reni's role as the city's leading painter of sacred subjects. Some of his later works are closer to the style of Reni, and are painted with much greater luminosity and clarity than his early works with their prominent use of chiaroscuro.  In 1655, the Franciscan Order of Reggio paid him 300 ducats for the altarpiece of Saint Luke Displaying a Painting of the Madonna and Child (now in Nelson-Atkins Museum of Art, Kansas City). The Corsini also paid him 300 ducats for the Flagellation of Christ painted in 1657.

Works and pupils
Guercino was remarkable for the extreme rapidity of his executions: he completed no fewer than 106 large altarpieces for churches, and his other paintings amount to about 144. He was also a prolific draftsman. His production includes many drawings, usually in ink, washed ink, or red chalk. Most of them were made as preparatory studies for his paintings, but he also drew landscapes, genre subjects, and caricatures for his own enjoyment. Guercino's drawings are known for their fluent style in which "rapid, calligraphic pen strokes combined with dots, dashes, and parallel hatching lines describe the forms".

Guercino continued to paint and teach until his death in 1666, amassing a notable fortune. As he never married, his estate passed to his nephews and pupils, Benedetto Gennari II and Cesare Gennari. Other pupils include Giulio Coralli, Giuseppe Bonati of Ferrara, Cristoforo Serra of Cesena, Father Cesare Pronti of Ferrara, Sebastiano Ghezzi, Sebastiano Bombelli, Lorenzo Bergonzoni of Bologna, Francesco Paglia of Brescia., Benedetto Zallone of Cento, Bartolomeo Caravoglia, Giuseppe Maria Galeppini of Forli, and Matteo Loves.

Works

Exhibitions 
A groundbreaking exhibition held at the Archiginnasio of Bologna in 1968 provided the most complete panorama of Guercino's work to date, including paintings from the later parts of his career after the death of Pope Gregory XV, which had previously attracted relatively little attention. For the fourth centenary of the artist's birth in 1991, an expanded exhibition was organized by the Pinacoteca Nazionale di Bologna in conjunction with the Schirn Kunsthalle Frankfurt and the National Gallery of Art, Washington. Both these exhibitions were curated by Guercino's biggest modern champion, Denis Mahon, who was responsible for their catalogues. In 2011–2012, a large exhibition was displayed at Palazzo Barberini in Rome, dedicated to the memory of Mahon, who had recently died. An exhibition displayed at the National Museum in Warsaw in 2013–2014 offered another extensive presentation of the artist's work.

Citations

References
Books and articles on Guercino
 
 
  
  
 
 
 .

Further reading

External links

 Paintings by Guercino on the Web Gallery of Art
 Getty exhibition of Guercino drawings
 Encyclopædia Britannica, Il Guercino
 Pinacoteca Civica Il Guercino
 Virtual exhibition "Guercino a Fano" in high resolution
 Jusepe de Ribera, 1591–1652, an exhibition catalog from The Metropolitan Museum of Art (fully available online as PDF), which contains material on Guercino (see index)
 Velázquez , an exhibition catalog from The Metropolitan Museum of Art (fully available online as PDF), which contains material on Guercino (see index)

Painters from Bologna
Italian Baroque painters
1591 births
1666 deaths
Italian male painters
People from Cento
17th-century Italian painters
Catholic painters
Catholic draughtsmen